Doriprismatica rossi is a species of sea slug, a dorid nudibranch, a shell-less marine gastropod mollusk in the family Chromodorididae.

Distribution 
This species was described from West Manghar Island, Saudi Arabia, Red Sea.

References

Chromodorididae
Gastropods described in 2018